Andrea Caroppo (born 26 June 1979 in Minervino di Lecce) is an Italian politician who was elected as a member of the European Parliament in 2019.

References

Living people
1979 births
MEPs for Italy 2019–2024
Lega Nord MEPs
Lega Nord politicians